Magic of Christmas is a holiday album released in 2007 by American country music singer, Marie Osmond. It was Osmond's first studio album since 1989's Steppin' Stone, as well as her first Christmas album.

Osmond released this album following her appearance on Dancing with the Stars. This album features guest vocals from siblings, Donny Osmond, Jimmy Osmond and Merrill Osmond. The album is a mixture of cover versions of Christmas standards, such as "The Christmas Song" and "Away in a Manger" as well as new songs such as "The Locket" and "Christmas in the Country." It includes traditional holiday big-band music, as well Country and Christian ballads.

Released on the independent label, Hi-Fi label, The Magic of Christmas charted among the Billboard 200 albums chart, reaching a peak of number 93 towards the end of the year. It also peaked at number 4 on the Top Christian Albums chart and number 9 on the Top Independent Albums chart the same year.

Track listing 

Track information and credits adapted from Discogs, then verified from the album's liner notes.

Charts

References

Marie Osmond albums
2007 Christmas albums
Christmas albums by American artists
Country Christmas albums